is a Japanese actor. He is represented with Kaos Performance Office.

Discography

Singles

Albums

Videos

Filmography

Stage

Live shows

Events

TV drama

TV series

Films

Photobooks

References

External links
  

1985 births
Living people
Actors from Hiroshima
21st-century Japanese singers
21st-century Japanese male actors